Stultz is an unincorporated community in southern Texas County, in the U.S. state of Missouri. The community is located on a tributary of Elk Creek, approximately 2.3 miles east-southeast of the community of Elk Creek.

History
A post office called Stultz was established in 1887, and remained in operation until 1941. The community has the name of Lamech Stultz, a pioneer citizen.

References

Unincorporated communities in Texas County, Missouri
Unincorporated communities in Missouri